Riccardo Mattelli (born 1 January 1994) is a former Italian footballer.

External links
 

1994 births
Living people
Italian footballers
A.S.D. Città di Foligno 1928 players
Serie C players
Serie D players
Association football defenders